The Computer Generated 2 was an ident used by BBC2 between 18 June 1979 and 30 March 1986. It was the first computer generated television station identification in the world.

Launch
The ident package was launched in June 1979. The ident was aired through a solid-state computer device, not unlike the one used later for BBC1's Computer Originated World, built by BBC engineers, and designed by Oliver Elmes. The concept of the double striped '2' had been around for a long time: following the two television channels dropping corporate branding, a similar look was adopted by both channels featuring double striped numbers and BBC letters. The doubled striped '2' had been in use on programme promotions since 1977 and on holding slides since 1978.

Components of the look
The ident itself featured a cream, double striped numeral 2, with two orange lines either side going off screen. The whole ident had the illusion of three dimensions, with orange shadows, all on a black background. The ident would either remain static, scroll in from the left hand side or scroll out to the right. The form up ident was accompanied by an electronic fanfare, which was dropped in 1983. A subtitled programme would be accompanied by the additional caption below the numeral stating 'Ceefax 270' and later following a change of page 'Ceefax 888'.

The clock which accompanied this new look was located in the BBC2 Noddy room and comprised an orange clock face with counters of ever increasing thickness and with a 'polo' mint centre upon a black background. A plain orange and white 2D striped '2' logo was placed below the clock. The use of this old clock was due to the fact that the technology did not exist for an electronic timepiece, and would not until 1980, when an electronic timepiece was finally obtained for BBC2. This new electronic clock had no second hand judder and had a changed design, featuring two dashes at the quarter hours and single dashes elsewhere. The polo mint centre was abandoned in favour of a simple centre dot, and the 3D striped '2' logo adorned the bottom of the screen, although it was unanimated.

Promotional style wasn't uniform, but generally featured the striped '2' in the promotion in one form or another, whether at the beginning or appearing on the end slide. Programme slides featured a large white 2 with programme title overlaid the bottom of the image. This branding preceded the inception of the new ident by several months, with slides featuring the striped '2' from as early as late 1978. The BBC2 special Christmas ident of 1978, featuring rotating buglers, also incorporated this version of the striped '2'.

Regional variations of BBC2 featured the region name below the 2.

A variation of the look was introduced on 19 September 1983 and was used during the Daytime on 2 strand. It featured the ident with an orange gradient background.

Special Idents
Some special versions were produced for public celebrations such as Christmas:

Christmas 1979 - A revolving perspex snowflake rotates over a white version of the logo at the bottom of the screen.
Christmas 1980 - Similar to the previous year, a more colourful perspex snowflake rotating above a Christmas BBC2 caption
Christmas 1981 - Three red translucent candles spinning around with the caption Christmas 2
Christmas 1982 - Three green perspex Christmas trees with a hand-drawn, angular BBC2 caption.
Christmas 1983 - Another similar theme to the previous year. Three metallic Christmas trees spinning against the Christmas 2 caption.
Christmas 1984 - A pink bauble with the '2' on it remains stationary while a stylised ribbon spelling 'Christmas' rotating around it.
Christmas 1985 - A blue tinted Christmas scene rotates around the '2'.

Special uses
The ident was reused in early 2005 for the opening continuity announcement in the second series of the period comedy Look Around You.

It was reused again in May 2010, with a new soundtrack, as part of BBC Two's "80's Season", to celebrate events and features from the decade.

It was then brought back twice in October 2012, with no soundtrack. It was shown nationally during the final evening hours of 21 October at 4:35am to lead into the final edition of Pages From Ceefax after 38 years on-screen across the BBC.

On 7 October 2013, this (and its Christmas '79, '84 & '85 ident in England and Northern Ireland), along with others was brought back for BBC Two's "Afternoon Classics" block and last appeared in December 2016.

It made its final appearance in 2017 to introduce the 80s-set comedy White Gold.

References

External links

TVARK 1979 Idents and Continuity
TV Room 1979 Idents
MHP Ident Zone 1979
625:Andrew Wiseman's Television Room - BBC Logo Gallery
Ident Gallery Special Pres 2013

BBC Two
BBC Idents
Television technology
Television presentation in the United Kingdom